Rønnaug Alten (9 February 1910 – 20 January 2001) was a Norwegian actress and stage instructor.

Biography
She was born in Tromsø, Norway. Her parents were Emil Bredenbech Melle (1878–1950) and Ragna Aass (1880–1975). After her parents' divorce in 1913, she was raised by her mother and her stepfather, Supreme Court Justice Edvin Alten (1876–1967). Her sister Berit Alten (1915–2002) was married to literary historian Asbjørn Aarnes (1923–2013). She grew up in Kristiania (now Oslo) and attended Frogner School graduating artium in 1928.

In 1932, she was married to actor Georg Løkkeberg (1909–1986). Their marriage was dissolved in 1947. She was the mother of film director and screenwriter Pål Løkkeberg (1934–1998).

She made her stage debut at Den Nationale Scene in 1930 as "Viola" in Shakespeare's play Twelfth Night. During her career, she worked for various theatres, including Det Nye Teater (1931–38), Nationaltheatret (1935), Trøndelag Teater (1945–48), Riksteatret (1949–51), Folketeatret (1952–59), Oslo Nye Teater (1959–68) and Teatret Vårt in Molde (1972–74). Her final performance was at the Riksteatret in 1975.

Rønnaug Alten's film career began in 1936 with a role under film director Olav Dalgard. She also translated and organized a series of recordings for NRK. She served as an instructor principally for children's performances. She was a board member of the Norwegian Actors' Equity Association. 
She was decorated Knight, First Class of the Order of St. Olav in 1982. Also in 1982, she shared the award forBest Actress at the 18th Guldbagge Awards with Sunniva Lindekleiv and Lise Fjeldstad for their roles in Little Ida.

External links

References

1910 births
2001 deaths
People from Tromsø
Norwegian stage actresses
Norwegian film actresses
20th-century Norwegian actresses
Best Actress Guldbagge Award winners
 Recipients of the St. Olav's Medal
Burials at Vestre gravlund